The Sarawak Native People's Party, legally known as Parti Bansa Dayak Sarawak (abbreviated PBDS) is a registered centre-right political party based in Sarawak, Malaysia. It was relatively new when its registration just approved by the Registrar of Society (RoS) on 28 August 2013.

PBDS Baru was to contest 5 Dayak-majority seats in the 2016 Sarawak state election.

PBDS Baru ahead of the 2018 general election had chosen the pig character as its mascot in which the animal has a deep meaning in the Dayak custom and symbolises the unity of the various Dayak tribes in Sarawak. The party only accepts members from the Dayak ethnicity.

PBDS Baru was deregistered by the RoS on 11 June 2019 for failing to submit its annual returns for the years 2014 to 2017 which was supposedly done by the out-going office bearers lost in party election. The party however has its registration reinstated on 6 August 2020 by the Home Ministry following an appeal by the newly elected party leaders.

The current PBDS party leadership is led by Bobby anak William who was elected President since 2019. It was also one of the party components of the new Perikatan Rakyat Bersatu Sarawak (PERKASA) coalition, with another two centre-right local political parties, Parti Bumi Kenyalang (PBK) and Parti Sarawak Bersatu (PSB).

PBDS Leadership Structure (2022–2025)

PBDS Supreme Leaders Council 

 President:
 Bobby anak William
 Deputy Presidents:
 Mejar (B) Moses anak Ripai
 Julius Enchana Jasper Ancho
 Kipli anak Ayom

 Vice-Presidents:
 
 
 
 

 Secretary-General:
 Sai Malaka
 Treasurer:
 
 Information Chief:
 Andrew Bugie Ipang
 Organising Secretary:
  
 Director of Communications:
 
 Director of Electoral Strategies:
 
 Central Committee Members:

PBDS Pemuda Wing (Pemuda PBDS) 

 Pemuda Chief:
 Robert Sawing
 Deputy Pemuda Chief(s):
 

 Vice Pemuda Chief(s):
 

 

 

Pemuda Secretary:

Pemuda Organising Secretary:
 
Pemuda Treasurer:
 
Pemuda Information Chief:

Pemuda Communications Strategy Chief:
 
Pemuda Electoral Strategy Chief:
 
Pemuda Committee Members:

PBDS Women's Wing (Wanita PBDS) 

 Women's Chief:
 Susan anak George
 Deputy Women's Chief(s): 

 Vice-Women's Chief(s): 
 

 Women's Secretary: 
 Women's Treasurer: 
 Women's Information Chief: 
 Women's Electoral Strategy Chief: 
 Women's Committee Members: 

 PBDS Youth's Wing (Belia PBDS) 

 PBDS Youth Chief: 
 Deputy Youth Chief(s): 

 Vice Youth Chief(s): 

 
 Secretary:Organising Secretary: Treasurer: PBDS Youth Information Chief:Communications Strategy Chief: Electoral Strategy Chief: 
 PBDS Youth Committee Members''':

General election result

State election results

Candidates in the Sarawak state election 
 Parti Bansa Dayak Sarawak Baru candidates, 2016 Sarawak state election

See also 
 Politics of Malaysia
 List of political parties in Malaysia

References

External links 
 
 

Political parties in Sarawak
Political parties established in 2013
2013 establishments in Malaysia